Fred Lawrence Whipple (November 5, 1906 – August 30, 2004) was an American astronomer, who worked at the Harvard College Observatory for more than 70 years. Amongst his achievements were asteroid and comet discoveries, the "dirty snowball" hypothesis of comets, and the invention of the Whipple shield.

Life 

Whipple was born on November 5, 1906, in Red Oak, Iowa, as the son of a farmer. An early bout with polio ended his ambition of being a professional tennis player. Whipple studied at Occidental College in Southern California, then majored in mathematics at the University of California at Los Angeles, graduating in 1927. Recollecting his path from mathematics to astronomy, Whipple stated in a 1978 autobiography that his "mathematics major veered [him] through physics and finally focused on astronomy where time, space, mathematics, and physics had a common meeting ground."

After taking a class in astronomy, he enrolled at the University of California, Berkeley where he obtained his PhD in Astronomy in 1931. While in graduate school, he helped map the orbit of the then newly discovered dwarf planet Pluto. He joined Harvard College Observatory in 1931 and studied the trajectories of meteors, confirming that they originated within the Solar System rather than from interstellar space. In 1933, he discovered the periodic comet 36P/Whipple and the asteroid 1252 Celestia. He also discovered or co-discovered five other non-periodic comets, the first of which was C/1932 P1 Peltier-Whipple, independently discovered by the famed amateur astronomer Leslie Peltier.

During World War II, he invented a device for cutting tinfoil into chaff, a radar countermeasure. He was awarded a Certificate of Merit for this in 1948. He also invented a "meteoroid bumper" or "Whipple shield", which protects spacecraft from impact by small particles by breaking them up.

From 1950 until 1977 he was a professor of Astronomy at Harvard University, including being the Phillips Professor of Astronomy between 1968 and 1977. During these years (in the early 1950s), he wrote a series of influential papers entitled A Comet Model, published  in Astrophysical Journal. In these papers, he proposed the "icy conglomerate" hypothesis of comet composition (later called the "dirty snowball" hypothesis). The basic features of this hypothesis were later confirmed; however, the exact amount (and thus the importance) of ices in a comet is an active field of research, with most of the recently obtained data pointing to a low contribution of ices to a comet's mass (dubbed the "icy dirtball" hypothesis). He also anticipated the era of artificial satellites and organized the members of Operation Moonwatch to track them. These groups were the only ones in the US prepared and ready to make observations when the Soviet Union unexpectedly launched Sputnik I in 1957.  He became director of the Smithsonian Astrophysical Observatory when Loyal Blaine Aldrich retired in 1955, and remained in this post until 1973.

Whipple made at least one media appearance, in the science documentary film Target...Earth? (1980). He also appeared in the BBC's coverage of the Giotto encounter with Halley's Comet, in 1986.

Whipple died in 2004, aged 97.

Honors 
Awards
 President's Award for Distinguished Federal Civilian Service, by US President John F. Kennedy (1963)
 Leonard Medal of the Meteoritical Society (1970)
Golden Plate Award of the American Academy of Achievement (1981)
 Gold Medal of the Royal Astronomical Society (1983)
 Bruce Medal of the Astronomical Society of the Pacific (1986)
 Henry Norris Russell Lectureship of the American Astronomical Society (1987)
 Whipple Award of the American Geophysical Union (1990)

Honors 

 Elected to the American Academy of Arts and Sciences (1941)
 Elected to the American Philosophical Society (1956)
 Elected to the United States National Academy of Sciences (1959)

Named after him
 Main-belt asteroid 1940 Whipple
 Whipple Observatory on Mount Hopkins in Arizona
 Whipple shield
 Whipple House on Great Camanoe in the British Virgin Islands (not to be confused with the John Whipple House, in Ipswich, Massachusetts).

References

Further reading

External links 

 
 Bruce Medal entry with picture 
 "Dr. Comet", 2002 CNN article
 Report of his death (BBC)
  Astronomy.com obituary
 Center for Astrophysics  Harvard & Smithsonian press release
 Londoner's WWII diary, 6 Feb 1943, observing Whipple's comet
 F. L. Whipple Oral History Interview from the Smithsonian Institution Archives
 George Field, "Fred Whipple", Biographical Memoirs of the National Academy of Sciences (2007)
 Fred Lawrence Whipple Collection, The University of Alabama in Huntsville Archives and Special Collections

20th-century American astronomers
Discoverers of asteroids
Discoverers of comets
Occidental College alumni
Planetary scientists
University of California, Los Angeles alumni
UC Berkeley College of Letters and Science alumni
Harvard University faculty
1906 births
2004 deaths
Recipients of the Gold Medal of the Royal Astronomical Society
People from Belmont, Massachusetts
People from Red Oak, Iowa
Harvard College Observatory people
Recipients of the President's Award for Distinguished Federal Civilian Service
Scientists from Iowa
Fellows of the American Geophysical Union
Members of the United States National Academy of Sciences
Members of the American Philosophical Society